Ballyagran is a village and townland in County Limerick, Ireland. As of the 2016 census, the village had a population of 179 people. Ballyagran is also the name of a half-parish in the Roman Catholic Diocese of Limerick.

History
Evidence of ancient settlement within the townland includes a moated ringfort site.

The local Roman Catholic church is dedicated to Saint Michael and was built in 1964 on the site of an earlier 19th century chapel.

Ballyagran's national school opened in 1974.

References

Towns and villages in County Limerick